The Critters were an American pop group with several hits in the 1960s, most notably "Mr. Dieingly Sad", a U.S. and Canadian Top 20 hit in 1966.

Career
The group formed in Plainfield, New Jersey, United States, in 1964 when singer-guitarist Don Ciccone (February 28, 1946 – October 8, 2016) went to see the band in which a friend of his, saxophonist Bob Podstawski, was a member. This local group was the Vibratones, comprising Jimmy Ryan (lead guitar), Ken Gorka (bass), Jack Decker (drums), and Chris Darway (keyboards) along with Podstawski. Ciccone was impressed by the group and asked Podstawski if he could arrange an audition with them. The group was taken by Ciccone's playing ability and the fact that he also wrote songs. Ciccone was asked to join with the group renaming themselves "The Critters", in emulation of similar band names like the Animals.

The Critters were originally signed to Musicor Records by Jimmy Radcliffe, who also produced their first release "Georgianna" backed with "I'm Gonna Give" in 1964. They eventually signed with Kapp Records, and in 1965 recorded John Sebastian's song "Younger Girl" for their first release. The song was selected for the band by producer Artie Ripp.  However, because Ciccone, Ryan, and Podstawski were then all accepted at Villanova University, the record was not completed until late 1965. "Younger Girl" became a minor pop hit in early 1966, and reached #38 in the UK Singles Chart in July that year. It was followed by Ciccone's song "Mr. Dieingly Sad", also produced by Ripp, which reached #17 later in the year, and by "Bad Misunderstanding", which reached #55 still later in 1966.  The group had their final chart hit with "Don't Let the Rain Fall Down on Me" in 1967, at #39. By the time "Younger Girl" and "Mr. Dieingly Sad" had their respective chart success, Ciccone had already left the group due primarily to the Viet Nam War and his draft status at the time. He had decided to join the U.S. Air Force, in which he would remain for four years, so he would have some choice as to where he would end up.

After recording several singles and one album (Younger Girl), the original band split up when Podstawski and Decker also joined the armed services and Darway left for art college.  Ryan and Gorka then attempted to maintain the group with new members for some time, releasing two more albums (Touch 'n Go With The Critters and Critters).

Later, Ryan recorded and toured with Carly Simon before working as a studio guitarist. Ciccone joined the Four Seasons, and he was a member of Frankie Valli and the Four Seasons (1973–81). He played guitar, bass and sang lead vocals to the Four Seasons song "December, 1963 (Oh, What a Night)", and later toured with Tommy James and the Shondells as bassist.

Gorka became a booking agent and co-owner of The Bitter End in Greenwich Village; he died on March 20, 2015, at age 68.

Ciccone died from a heart attack on October 8, 2016, at age 70.

Darway went on to form Johnny's Dance Band, a popular group in the Philadelphia area in the late 1970s, followed by the Chet Bolins Band.

Kurt Shanaman of Mountainside, New Jersey filled in on drums on tour and in the studio in 1967.

In 2007, the Critters re-formed when Ciccone was asked to join the band Skeezix, which included Albert Miller, Lenny Rocco, and Milt Koster.  Their repertoire included classic hits from all the bands Ciccone was involved with (including a slightly retitled "Mr. Dieingly Sad"), as well as original and cover material. The band performed mostly on the Treasure Coast of Florida.  The Critters recorded a new album, Time Pieces, which includes the updated "Mr. Dieingly Sad" and a new version of "Younger Girl".  The band announced their breakup in the summer of 2013.

Selective singles discography

References

American pop music groups
Kapp Records artists
Musical groups established in 1964